Stanley William Toomath (12 November 1925 – 20 March 2014) was a New Zealand architect who practised mainly in Wellington. He was a founding member of the Architectural Group in Auckland in 1946, a life member of the Wellington Architectural Centre and a Fellow of the New Zealand Institute of Architects.  Both the founding of the Group and the Architectural Centre were important factors in New Zealand's modernist architectural history.

Early life and education
Born in Lower Hutt, Toomath studied architecture at the Auckland College of the University of New Zealand between 1945 and 1949. He graduated with a Bachelor of Architecture, and was awarded a UNZ two-year travelling scholarship which took him to Europe in 1951.  Adding an early Fulbright Graduate Award in 1952 enabled him to complete a MArch at the Harvard Graduate School of Design where he was taught by I. M. Pei and was a co-student with John Hejduk. He briefly worked with Walter Gropius at the Architects' Collaborative and then with I. M. Pei before returning to New Zealand in 1954.

Architectural practice
On his return from New York Toomath set up practice, and three years later was joined by Derek Wilson to establish Toomath and Wilson. Toomath and Wilson were later joined by Don Irvine and Grahame Anderson in 1972, forming the firm Toomath Wilson Irvine Anderson Ltd.

Toomath's work reflects an exploratory and intelligent engagement with modernist architectural ideas.  A key architectural interest was the articulation of continuous space, which is particularly evident in his Toomath Senior house, Lower Hutt (1949), and the Mackay house, Silverstream (1961).  The Toomath Senior house is famous as the site of a discussion Toomath and Lew Martin had with architectural historian Nikolaus Pevsner about New Zealand construction.  Pevsner found the detailing of a post in the carport unrefined.  Toomath argued that it reflected an honesty in detailing, relevant to New Zealand architecture.  The Mackay House, Silverstream is symmetrically planned and was designed for a couple without children.  It was awarded the New Zealand Institute of Architects (NZIA) Bronze Medal in 1962.

Toomath's other key works include Wool House, Featherston Street, Wellington (1955, in association with Bernard Johns & Whitwell) and the Wellington Teachers' College, Donald Street, Karori (1966–1977).  The Wellington Teachers College, Karori, Stage One was awarded an NZIA Silver Medal (1972), and an NZIA Local Award (Enduring Architecture) (2005).  Wool House (also now known as Old Wool House) was recognised with an NZIA Wellington Branch Enduring Architecture Award (2002)and the residential Dobson House, Hankey St, Wellington received an NZIA Wellington Branch Enduring Architecture Award (2004)

Architectural exhibitions and advocacy
Following his return from studying architecture in the United States and working with Walter Gropius and I. M. Pei, Toomath spent the majority of his architectural career in New Zealand (including over 35 years in professional practice).  He was an advocate for several heritage buildings (see below), and played key roles in the Wellington Architectural Centre's projects on Wellington's urban form, namely: "Te Aro Replanned" (1947), "Homes Without Sprawl" (1957), "City Approaches" (1959) and "Wgtn 196X" (1961).  Toomath also presented professional evidence for the Wellington City Council on proposals for controlling building heights, protected viewshafts and urban form planning (1989–1990) in hearings before the Planning Tribunal.

Toomath led a small team whose report on the Old Town Hall stopped moves for its demolition.  He wrote papers on conservation matters and presented evidence in support of a number of heritage buildings including: the AMP Head Office Building, the State Fire Insurance Building, Wharf Sheds 7 and 21.  He had an active role in campaigns to save Old St Paul's.

Design educator
Toomath was also the Head of the School of Design, Wellington Polytechnic (1979–1989), and a contributor of articles to the New Zealand journal Designscape.  He was a regular participant of the "Designmark" Advisory Panels, New Zealand Industrial Design Council from 1969, and a Judge of the Prince Philip Award for New Zealand Industrial Design (1981–1985).

Documentary
Toomath is the subject of a documentary Antonello and the Architect, which reveals his influences, designs, ideas - and the painting that he built - Antonello da Messina's St Jerome in his Study.

Notes

References
"1962 Bronze Medal House: Silverstream, Wellington." Home and Building. XXVII.3(1964): 41.
Antonello and the Architect dir Tony Hiles (Wellington: City Associates, 2007)
"Awarded NZIA Bronze Medal: House, Silverstream, Wellington." Home and Building. XXV.12(1963): 40–43.
"Living Rooms." Design Review. 5.3(1953): 63–65.
"Wellington's Building Criticised." Dominion [Wellington] 10 Mar. 1961: 8.
"Wool House: New Building at Wellington for the New Zealand Wool Board." Home and Building. XXI.2(1958): 54–56.
New Zealand Who's Who Aotearoa 2001. ed. Alister Taylor. Auckland: Alister Taylor, 2001. 880.
Clark, Justine. "Space Explorer." New Zealand Home and Building. 5(1998): 170–73.
Clark, Justine, and Paul Walker. Looking for the Local: Architecture and the New Zealand Modern. Wellington: VUP, 2000.
Dudding, Michael. "A Final Formality: Three Modernist Pavilion Houses of the Early 1960s". "...about as austere as a Dior gown...": New Zealand architecture the 1960s: a one day symposium, Ed. Christine McCarthy. Wellington: VUW, 2005. 7-11.
Dudding, Michael. 'A Useful Exercise: The context, content, and practical application of W H Alington's 'Thesis on the Theory of Architectural Design'. Thesis. VUW, 2005.
Dudding, Michael. W H Alington Oral History Project. Wellington: Oral History centre, ALT: 2007.
Findlay, Michael. "House Your Father: A Breakthrough Home Design Has Been Buried beneath a Welter of 'Improvements'." New Zealand Heritage. 100(2006): 44–45.
Garrett, James. "Home Building - Our Tradition." Home and Building. XXI.5(1958): 33–45.
Gatley, Julia. "The Wellington CBD Replanned: Wgtn 196X." "...about as austere as a Dior gown...": New Zealand architecture the 1960s: a one day symposium. Ed. Christine McCarthy. Wellington: VUW, 2005. 17–25.
Jenkins, Douglas Lloyd. At Home: A Century of New Zealand Design. Auckland: Random House NZ, 2004.
Kernohan, David. Wellington's New Buildings: A Photographic Guide to New Buildings in Central Wellington. Wellington: VUP, 1989.
Kernohan, David. Wellington's Old Buildings: A Photographic Guide to Old Buildings in Central Wellington. Wellington: VUP, 1994.
Lee-Johnson, Eric, ed. Arts Yearbook 7. Wellington: Wingfield Press, 1951.
Marriage, Guy. "No Free Love: The Dearth of Media Output from the Architectural Centre in the Swinging Sixties."  "...About as Austere as a Dior Gown...": New Zealand Architecture The 1960s: A One Day Symposium. Ed. Christine McCarthy. Wellington: VUW, 2005. 63–67. 
McCarthy, Christine. "Going for Gold: New Zealand Houses in the 60s through the Veil of the NZIA Bronze Medals." "...about as austere as a Dior gown...": New Zealand architecture the 1960s: a one day symposium. Ed. Christine McCarthy. Wellington: VUW, 2005. 48–55.
McCarthy, Christine. "High Modern." Architecture New Zealand. Mar./Apr.(2006): 65–69.
Mitchell, David, and Gillian Chaplin. The Elegant Shed: New Zealand Architecture since 1945. Auckland: OUP, 1984.
Petry, Bruce. "Interview with Stanley William Toomath." NZ architecture post-World War II oral history project. Wellington: Oral History Centre, ATL, 1992.
Rotherham, Bruce. "As I See It." Architecture New Zealand. 2(2004): 17.
Shaw, Peter. A History of New Zealand Architecture. 1991. Auckland: Hodder Moa Beckett, 1997.
"Shopping Center in Three Circles". Interiors' magazine, CXIV, March 1955 pp. 72–5. New York.
Skinner, Robin. "Nikki Down Under: Impressions of Pevsner in New Zealand."  Loyalty and Disloyalty in the Architecture of the British Empire and Commonwealth: Selected Papers from the Thirteenth Annual Conference of the Society of Architectural Historians, Australia and New Zealand, Auckland, New Zealand, 1996. Ed. P. Goad & J. Willis. Melbourne: SAHANZ / University of Melbourne. 102–10. 
Staffan, Jan. "Interview with James Beard." Early Architectural Centre oral history project. Wellington: Oral History Centre, ATL, 2001.
Staffan, Jan. "Interview with William Stanley Toomath." Early Architectural Centre oral history project. Wellington: Oral History Centre, ATL, 2002.
"Teachers Training College, Wellington", NZIA Journal 39, 5 (1972): 154-59
"Toomath Wilson Irvine Anderson", NZIA Journal 42, 6 (1975): 174-84
Toomath, Stanley William. "Anscombe's 1940 Centennial Exhibition; and an historic confrontation" Formulation Fabrication: The Architecture of History: Proceedings of the seventeenth annual conference of the Society of Architectural Historians, Australia and New Zealand: Wellington, New Zealand, November 2000. Wellington: SAHANZ, 2000. 101–112.
Toomath, Stanley William. "Architecture in the Next 50 Years." The Journal of the NZ Institute of Architects. 23.3(1956): 55–61.
Toomath, Stanley William. "The Design of Interiors, Furniture, and the Selection of Components." NZIA Journal. 34.3(1967): 75–76.
Toomath, Stanley William. "Education by Design: The Architectural Centre - Educating the Public and Its Own." Architecture New Zealand. Jul./Aug.(1996): 59–62.
Toomath, Stanley William. "Geoff Nees: Trailblazer for Good Design." Prodesign. Apr./May(1999): 84–85.
Toomath, Stanley William. "The Gestation of the Group." Architecture New Zealand. 2(2004): 17.
Toomath, Stanley William. "A House at Lower Hutt." Design Review. 4.1(1951): 9-11.
Toomath, Stanley William. "A House in Stokes Valley." Design Review. 4.5(1952): 110–11.
Toomath, Stanley William. "Into the Post-War World."  Exquisite Apart: 100 Years of Architecture in New Zealand. Ed. Charles Walker. Auckland: Balasoglou Books, 2005. 248. 
Toomath, Stanley William. "Le Corbusier." NZIA Journal. 31.9(1964): 328–33.
Toomath, Stanley William. "Past Indicative." Designscape. 121(1980): 13–15.
Toomath, Stanley William. "Search for Expression of Human Values." NZIA Journal. 40.6(1973): 152–53.
Tyler, Linda. "The Urban and the Urbane: Ernst Plischke's Kahn House."  Zeal and Crusade: The Modern Movement in Wellington. Ed. John Wilson. Christchurch: Te Waihora, 1996. 33–38. 
Walker, Charles, ed. Exquisite Apart: 100 Years of Architecture in New Zealand. Auckland: Balasoglou Books, 2005.
Walker, Paul. "Order from Chaos: Replanning Te Aro."  Zeal and Crusade: The Modern Movement in Wellington. Ed. John Wilson. Christchurch: Te Waihora, 1996. 79–87. 
"Wellington Town Hall" NZ Historic Places Trust, Wellington Regional Newsletter 2, 2 (1979): 1-20
Wilson, John, ed. Zeal and Crusade: The Modern Movement in Wellington. Christchurch: Te Waihora Press, 1996.

1925 births
2014 deaths
University of Auckland alumni
New Zealand architects
People from Lower Hutt
Design educators
Harvard Graduate School of Design alumni
Fellows of the New Zealand Institute of Architects